As You Like It (随心所遇) is a Singaporean Chinese television series about four singles around the age of twenty, two guys and two girls, and the time they spend together discussing life, love, sex and work. It stars Tay Ping Hui, Ix Shen and Lynn Poh.

External links
AZN Television page
As You Like It (Chinese) on Mediacorp website

Singaporean television series